Ousmane Diop (born 9 December 1975) is a retired Senegalese footballer.

Career
Diop played for Xanthi and Egaleo in the Greek Alpha Ethniki. He also had a spell with Dobrudzha Dobrich in the Bulgarian A PFG.

Diop made several appearances for the Senegal national football team and played at the 2000 African Cup of Nations finals.

References

External links

1975 births
Living people
Senegalese footballers
Senegalese expatriate footballers
Senegal international footballers
2000 African Cup of Nations players
Xanthi F.C. players
Egaleo F.C. players
PFC Dobrudzha Dobrich players
AS Douanes (Senegal) players
Super League Greece players
First Professional Football League (Bulgaria) players
Expatriate footballers in Greece
Expatriate footballers in Bulgaria
Association football defenders